Alice Rohrwacher (born 29 December 1980) is an Italian film director, editor and screenwriter.

Her film Le pupille was nominated for Oscar in 2023 in short film categories.

Early life
Rohrwacher was born in Fiesole, in Tuscany, to an Italian mother and German father. She spent her youth in the village of Castel Giorgio, where her mother was born and her father Reinhard worked as a beekeeper. She is the sister of the Italian actress Alba Rohrwacher. She studied literature and philosophy at the University of Turin, then specialized in screenwriting at the Holden School in Turin.

Career
Her first experience in filmmaking was in 2006, when directing a part of the Italian documentary Checosamanca.

In 2011, she directed her first feature film, Heavenly Body, which premiered at the Directors' Fortnight during the 2011 Cannes Film Festival to critical acclaim.

Her second feature film, The Wonders, won the Grand Prix at the 2014 Cannes Film Festival. Also in
2014, Rohrwacher was appointed the President of the International Jury for the “Luigi De Laurentiis” Venice Award for a Debut Film at the 71st Venice International Film Festival.

She announced filming of her third film Lazzaro Felice in 2017 with the film starring Sergi López and Rohrwacher's sister Alba Rohrwacher. The film premiered at the 2018 Cannes Film Festival where it won the award for Best Screenplay. It was released by Netflix in December of that year.

Rohrwacher was invited to serve on the jury for the 2019 Cannes Film Festival.

Style 
Bong Joon-ho described her work as "a mix of magic realism and neorealism, innocent characters butting up against corrupt behemoths".

Filmography

As filmmaker

Other work

References

External links

1980 births
Living people
Italian film directors
Italian screenwriters
Italian women film directors
Italian people of German descent
Italian women screenwriters
People from Fiesole
University of Turin alumni
Cannes Film Festival Award for Best Screenplay winners